Louis-Marie-Pierre-Dominique Gillet (11 December 1876 – 1 July 1943) was a French art historian and literary historian.

Life
Louis Gillet was born in Paris on 11 December 1876. He studied at the Collège Stanislas de Paris and the École normale supérieure. In 1900, he became a lecturer on the French at the University of Greifswald; from 1907 to 1909 he was a professor at the Université Laval in Montreal. He became an art critic in Paris, before entering the armed forces. Gillet contributed a number of article to the Catholic Encyclopedia.

Works
Raphaël, 1907
Watteau, 1921
Trois variations sur Claude Monet, 1927
Esquisses anglaises, 1930
Essais sur l'art français, 1937, dedicated to Bernard Berenson.

References

1876 births
1943 deaths
Writers from Paris
French literary historians
French art historians
Members of the Académie Française
Burials at Père Lachaise Cemetery
French male non-fiction writers
Contributors to the Catholic Encyclopedia